Arthur Forrest (5 January 1932 in Bradford, England – 2000) was a former international speedway who qualified for the Speedway World Championship finals five times.

Career summary
Forrest started his career with the Halifax Dukes in the National League Division Three. In his opening season aged just seventeen he scored nineteen maximums (unbeaten by an opponent) from fifty meetings. The following season the Dukes rode in National League Division Two, but Forrest carried on from the previous season, actually raising his average. Whilst with the Dukes he was called up to ride for England at only eighteen years of age. After a third season with the Dukes in 1951 he joined hometown club, the Bradford Tudors in 1952.

The Tudors competed in National League Division One and Forrest rode so well he became top of the teams averages, and qualified for the first of his five World final appearances. He remained with the Tudors until 1957 before joining the Coventry Bees but his career seemed to have already peaked in 1956 when he finished in third place of the Speedway World Championship after beating Peter Craven in a run off.

At the end of the 1959 season, Forrest retired from speedway at only twenty six years of age.

World final appearances
 1952 –  London, Wembley Stadium – 9th – 7pts
 1953 –  London, Wembley Stadium – 8th – 7pts
 1954 –  London, Wembley Stadium – 10th – 5pts
 1955 –  London, Wembley Stadium – 9th – 7pts
 1956 –  London, Wembley Stadium – 3rd – 11pts + 3pts

References

1932 births
2000 deaths
British speedway riders
English motorcycle racers
Bradford Tudors riders
Coventry Bees riders
Halifax Dukes riders